Laportea is a genus of plants in the family Urticaceae. They are herbaceous, either annual or perennial. Like many plants of the  Urticaceae, they have stinging hairs. There are stinging and non-stinging hairs on the same plant. The genus was named after the French naturalist Francis de Laporte de Castelnau.

Species

, Kew's Plants of the World Online lists 36 species in the genus Laportea:

References

Urticaceae genera
Taxa named by François-Louis Laporte, comte de Castelnau
Taxonomy articles created by Polbot